, subtitled La Légende du Vent de l'Univers (lit. the Legend of the Wind of the Universe), is an anime television series, co-animated by Satelight and Gonzo and produced by Sony Pictures Entertainment, Asahi Broadcasting Corporation (ABC), GDH and Sotsu Agency, which first aired in Japan on Asahi Broadcasting Corporation from April 4, 2006 and September 21, 2006.

It spanned a total of 26 episodes, with an alternate episode 17 also being released. The series was also later broadcast by the anime television network Animax across its English-language networks in Southeast Asia and South Asia as well as its other networks worldwide.

The series, directed by Minoru Ōhara and written by Shōji Yonemura, features original character designs from Okama. The mechanical designs for the series are provided by Shōji Kawamori and Kazutaka Miyatake with Yutaka Izubuchi being the concept advisor.

Overview
The series follows a war occurring in a galaxy ruled by the tyrannical self-declared Holy Emperor Vetti Lunard Sforza de Roselait. Michel Volban de Cabelle, Leader of the People's Army, opposes Vetti's rule, but the rebels are no match for the forces of Vetti's Holy Imperial Army.

In despair, Michel seeks help from an undefeatable Glass Fleet, which bears the crest of the old Royal Family. Its Captain, Cleo Aiolos Corbeille de Veil, a man of great capability, claims to be their descendant.

But things do not work well, as Cleo is now only a "Space Pirate", instead of being the Prince of the respected Royal Family, which was defeated a long time ago.

In their entwined journeys, the Emperor and the rebels encounter the Prophet Guildy, who foresees that 'When The End comes, a Two Headed Eagle will be born. One of The Heads will be clad in Metal Armor and The Other will become The God of Love. Then it will become as One to Restore the Galaxy!"

Main characters
 / 
The figurehead of the People's Army. She is actually the sister of the real Michel Volban who has disappeared in the war with Vetti. A man resembling her brother was part of the attack force that infiltrated the glass battleship. This man was emotionless, brainwashed and was constantly attacking Michel, but she still believed he was her brother. In the end, when this man and Cleo were about to be sucked out into the depths of space, she chose to save Cleo and said that man was no brother of hers. At the end of the episode, it was shown that the man was her real brother, as evidenced by the X-shaped scar on his back. Michel's personality is due to her past. She did not remember her mother, as she died months after Michel was born, and her father was rarely home. She learned to fight from her brother, who had become a major role model in her life. She loved fencing and wished to be like her brother(which may explain her tomboyish attitude). After her father had seen her fencing with her brother, and that she surpassed him, she was ordered to be more like a lady of a royal house. After that incident, she vowed to herself that she would become a proper lady. But after her father's death, and her brother's during the major battle in the beginning of the series, she renounces her identity and becomes her brother in order to save the People's Army from destruction. In order to do this, she chooses to truly "become" her brother, by gaining an X-shaped scar on her back like her brother had once gotten from a battle with Vetti, and also renouncing her real name, Racine Blance. All the effort to act as "Michel" was due to her love for him, which was beyond sibling love. In later episodes, she falls in love with Cleo Corbeille. She is voiced by Yuko Kaida in the original Japanese and her English voice is supplied by Laura Bailey.

A supposed descendant of the royal family who has gathered a crew of people who are wanted all over the galaxy for their special abilities; they follow Cleo and later wind up following Michel in order to save Cleo. Cleo's personality is "like the wind" - to his comrades it's unpredictable where his next destination will be or which way he wavers. His rough, seemingly uncaring personality was shown bluntly to Michel and her followers when they first meet after being saved by him. At first, to Michel's servants, he seems more like a pirate than a savior: only caring about material things than anything or anyone else as he wishes for payment for saving Michel. As the storyline progresses, Cleo shows more and more defiance towards the idea of fighting with the People's Army while with them. It is not until the first big battle begins, where his newfound rival, Vetti is to be watching, that he truly becomes serious. In later episodes, he falls in love with Michel Volban (Racine Blanch). He is voiced by Kenjiro Tsuda in the Japanese version and by Travis Willingham in the English dub.

He takes on Michel Volban de Cabelle, the figurehead of the People's Army, and uses Michel as bait to lure out Cleo. He is the Holy Emperor, and wanted to unite the galaxy in order to be able to obtain the technology of the battleship that transcends space and time. He uses whatever means he can, even marriage to Rachel, the daughter of the Pope (who initially despises him). He also has an innate dislike (later turned obsession) for Cleo, (who he sees as a rival) and a fascination with Michel who was initially his rival before Cleo. He even goes as far as drugging and kissing Michel, who he did not know was a woman, and may have possibly raped her afterwards, as he does not confirm her accusations. After he finds out that she is a woman and not Michel, Vetti loses all interest in her and his attention turns to Cleo. Vetti revealed that he wants to obtain the technology because he has an incurable disease and may die soon. Vetti has Heterochromia - one of his eyes is gold, and one is gray. Akira Ishida (Japanese) and Ernesto Jason Liebrecht (English) provide his voice.

The loyal and faithful companion of Michel. He faithfully follows Michel, protecting her secret. Upon her request, he scarred Racine's back to resemble her brother's. He is the butler of Michel's household. He is voiced by Yasushi Miyabayashi in the Japanese version and by Robert Bruce Elliott in the English dub.

Jean's granddaughter and Michel's maid. She follows Michel faithfully. She shows some skills in piloting ships, and has even piloted the Glass Ship in Eimer's absence. She constantly argues with Eimer, and later falls in love with Heizak. She is voiced by Shizuka Itō in the Japanese version and by Monica Rial in the English dub.

She is the pilot of the Glass Ship. She is considered one of the best pilots, able to move the Glass Ship swiftly and effectively. She constantly teases Nowy, and has a secret crush on Cleo. At first, before she knew that Michel was actually a girl, Eimer fell for Michel. She caused the secret of Michel's gender to be revealed when she supposedly crashed into Michel's bathroom. Before, she used to live in a small village and was their leader. However, in an act to protect her village, she caused the village greater harm than good. Betrayed, she decided to take revenge on the lord who caused the mess. During this time, she had met Cleo, who quietly observed her. After she failed the attack, only barely getting past the gates, the lord's mansion lost power, sparing Eimer. Later, it is shown that because of Eimer's 'Distraction', Cleo was able to steal the power source needed for his Glass Ship, which in turn saved Eimer's life. This is when he invites Eimer to join his crew. Eimer shows a lot of enthusiasm whenever Cleo is involved, and will willingly place her life in danger to save Cleo's. Eimer is a very rough speaking person and is very tough with strangers. She is voiced by Kana Ueda in the Japanese version and by Luci Christian in the English dub.

A young boy who lives to serve Vetti. Always at the man's side, Ralph is a constant annoyance when trying to ensure Vetti's health. When Vetti's health starts to deteriorate, Ralph uses every means necessary to try to help, even confronting to Holy Oracle for guidance. The relationship between Ralph and Vetti is never fully explained, though it is obvious the young boy is in love with the man. These feelings are never revealed as Ralph is murdered in his misguided idea of obtaining peace in the "Black Cross", the over - ruling religion of the galaxy. He is voiced by Rie Kugimiya in the Japanese version and by Brina Palencia in the English dub.

Staff
Original concept: Gonzo
Director: Minoru Ōhara
Series composition: Shōji Yonemura
Original character designs: Okama
Animation character designs and chief animation director: Yūko Watanabe
Mechanical designs: Shōji Kawamori, Kazutaka Miyatake
Concept advisor: Yutaka Izubuchi
3D-CGI director: Hitoshi Yagishita
Art director: Takeshi Waki
Color settings: Kayoko Nishi
Photography director: Teruo Abe
Editing: Fumi Hida
Sound director: Jin Akatagawa
Sound production: Magic Capsule
Music: Kōsuke Yamashita
Animation production: Satelight, Gonzo
Production: Asahi Broadcasting Corporation, GDH, Sotsu Agency, Sony Pictures Entertainment

Theme songs
 Opening theme
  – Performance: mihimaru GT
 Ending theme
  – Performance: Plastic Tree (eps 1-13)
  – Performance: ANZA (eps 14-26)

Episode list

Reception
"In the end, Glass Fleet tends to suffer from having too many stupid people milling about in control of massive fleets, weapons and soldiers. At this point I'm tempted to believe those stupid people may be the creative staff as this is looking like the first stages of a serious train wreck." — Chris Beveridge, Mania.
"Glass Fleet is the anime fans of Last Exile have been waiting for. Suspenseful, fantastic animation, and a bevy of intriguing characters, this is an involving sci-fi drama series filled with action, mystery, and the thrilling journey of a young noble in search of justice." — Holly Ellingwood, activeAnime.
"Glass Fleet is off to quite a start. The show has great pacing and exhilarating inter-stellar battles. This volume ends on quite a cliffhanger, and one would hope that Cleo will figure out Michel's secret sooner or later." — Jeffrey Harris, IGN.
"Gonzo and co-producer Satelight have a great-looking piece of work here, but the story lacks a consistent tone and tries to do (and be) too many different things. The first volume shows potential but has yet to realize it." — Theron Martin, Anime News Network.
"If you like politically charged sci-fi on an epic scale—along with sassy teen pilots in slinky lingerie, boozing pirates sporting eyepatches and a strong undercurrent of swirling ambisexual possibilities—Glass Fleet is definitely your show." — Jack Wiedrick, Newtype USA.

References

External links
Official Site 
Glass Fleet at Funimation 

Anime with original screenplays
Funimation
Gonzo (company)
Satelight
Science fiction anime and manga
Anime series